The following article presents a summary of the 2007 football (soccer) season in Paraguay.

First division results
The first division tournament was divided in two sections: the Apertura and the Clausura and had 12 teams participating in a two round all-play-all system. The team with the most points at the end of the two rounds was crowned as the champion.

Torneo Apertura

Torneo Clausura

Championship game playoff
The national championship game was played between the Apertura and Clausura tournaments winners.

Libertad declared as national champions by aggregate score of 3-1.

Aggregate table

Relegation / Promotion
 Sportivo Trinidense automatically relegated to the second division after finishing last in the aggregate points table.
 Club 12 de Octubre finished second-to-last in the aggregate points table, so had to participate in the promotion play-off game against second division runners-up Club General Diaz. 12 de Octubre won the playoff game by an aggregate score of 5-4, so it remains in the first division.

Qualification to international competitions
Sportivo Luqueño qualified to the Copa Libertadores 2008 by winning the Torneo Apertura.
Libertad qualified to the Copa Libertadores 2008 by winning the Torneo Clausura and the 2008 Copa Sudamericana by winning the national championship.
Cerro Porteño qualified to the 2008 Copa Libertadores as the best finisher in the aggregate points table.
Olimpia Asunción qualified to the 2008 Copa Sudamericana as the second-best finisher in the aggregate points table.

Lower divisions results

Paraguayan teams in international competitions
Copa Libertadores 2007:
Libertad: quarterfinals
Cerro Porteño: group-stage
Tacuary: preliminary round
Copa Sudamericana 2007:
Tacuary: preliminary second round
Libertad: preliminary first round

Paraguay national team
The following table lists all the games played by the Paraguay national football team in official competitions during 2007.

References
 Paraguay 2007 by Eli Schmerler at RSSSF
 Diario ABC Color

 
Seasons in Paraguayan football